Saloá is a city in the state of Pernambuco, Brazil. It is 263 km away from the state capital Recife, and has an estimated (IBGE 2020) population of 15,862 inhabitants.

Geography
 State - Pernambuco
 Region - Agreste Pernambucano
 Boundaries - Paranatama   (N);  Bom Conselho and Terezinha   (S); Garanhuns    (E);  Iati   (W)
 Area - 252.08 km2
 Elevation - 745 m
 Hydrography - Ipanema River
 Vegetation - Caatinga Hipoxerófila
 Climate - Semi arid - hot
 Annual average temperature - 20.6 c
 Distance to Recife - 263 km

Economy
The main economic activities in Saloá are based in commerce and agribusiness, especially manioc, beans, tomatoes, coffee; and livestock such as cattle, sheep and poultry.

Economic indicators

Economy by Sector
2006

Health indicators

References

Municipalities in Pernambuco